Kosmos 321 ( meaning Cosmos 321), also known as DS-U2-MG No.1, was a Soviet satellite which was launched in 1970 as part of the Dnepropetrovsk Sputnik programme. It was a  spacecraft, which was built by the Yuzhnoye Design Bureau, and was used to investigate the magnetic poles of the Earth.

Launch 
A Kosmos-2I 63SM carrier rocket was used to launch Kosmos 321 into low Earth orbit. The launch took place from Site 133/1 at the Plesetsk Cosmodrome. The launch occurred at 20:19:59 UTC on 20 January 1970, and resulted in the successful insertion of the satellite into orbit. Upon reaching orbit, the satellite was assigned its Kosmos designation, and received the International Designator 1970-006A. The North American Aerospace Defense Command assigned it the catalogue number 04308.

Orbit 
Kosmos 321 was the first of two DS-U2-MG satellites to be launched, the other being Kosmos 356. It completed operations on 13 March 1970, before decaying from orbit and reentering the atmosphere on 23 March.

References

Kosmos 00321
Spacecraft launched in 1970
1970 in the Soviet Union
Dnepropetrovsk Sputnik program